The 63rd District of the Iowa House of Representatives in the state of Iowa.

Current elected officials
Sandy Salmon is the representative currently representing the district.

Past representatives
The district has previously been represented by:
 Robert Kreamer, 1971–1973
 Carl V. Nielsen, 1973–1979
 Richard Sherzan, 1979–1981
 Dennis L. Renaud, 1981–1983
 George R. Swearingen, 1983–1989
 Robert L. Kistler, 1989–1993
 Teresa Garman, 1993–2003
 Scott Raecker, 2003–2013
 Sandy Salmon, 2013–present

References

063